The 1920 Duquesne Dukes football team represented Duquesne University during the 1920 college football season. The head coach was Jake Stahl, coaching his first season with the Dukes.

Schedule

References

Duquesne
Duquesne Dukes football seasons
Duquesne Dukes football